LaPrade Valley is a valley in the Cumulus Hills of Antarctica with steep rock walls and ice-covered floor, about  long, extending north to McGregor Glacier, just west of Rougier Hill. It was named by the Texas Tech Shackleton Glacier Expedition (1964–65) for Kerby E. LaPrade, a graduate student at Texas Technological College, and a member of the expedition.

References

Valleys of the Ross Dependency
Dufek Coast